Phil Farrell is a former professional rugby league footballer who played in the 1990s and 2000s.

International honours
Farrell won a cap for Ireland while at Oldham. 2003 1-cap.

Family

He is the brother of current Ireland Rugby Union Head Coach Andy Farrell and Uncle to Andy's son England Rugby Union outhalf Owen Farrell

References

External links
Statistics at orl-heritagetrust.org.uk
Representative at orl-heritagetrust.org.uk

brother of current Ireland Head Coach

Ireland national rugby league team players
Lancashire rugby league team players
Living people
Oldham R.L.F.C. players
Place of birth missing (living people)
Rochdale Hornets players
Rugby league second-rows
Year of birth missing (living people)